Amanat is a 2022 Russian historical war film directed by Anton Sivers and Rauf Kubayev. The main military history of the Russian Empire in the first half of the 19th century, after the Siege of Akhoulgo, the main conflict of the Caucasian War of 1817-1864.

This film was theatrically released on May 26, 2022 by KaroRental.

Plot 
The film takes place in the middle of the 19th century, during the Caucasian War. In 1839, Imam Shamil transferred his son Jamalutdin to the Russian Empire as an amanat or hostage.

At the age of nine, the boy became a pupil of the imperial court of Nicholas I, enlisted in the army and became a lieutenant. The passionate Caucasian young man fell in love with General Olenin's daughter Elisabeth Olenina at first sight and intended to marry her. However, the blood father confused his plans, exchanging his son for the captive granddaughters of Georgian King George XII, and returned him to his father's house. Jamalutdin has to make a difficult choice between his duty to his people and honor, as well as his love and feelings for Lisa Olenina.

Cast 
 Arslan Murzabekov as Imam Shamil
 Amin Khuratov as Lieutenant Jamalutdin, the eldest son of Imam Shamil
 Kamil Murzabekov as Jamalutdin in childhood
 Varvara Komarova as Elisabeth "Lisa" Olenina
 Antonina Stepakova as Lisa Olenina in childhood
 Andrey Sokolov as Emperor Nicholas I of Russia
 Andrey Fomin as Emperor Alexander II of Russia
 Vitaly Kovalenko as Pyotr Olenin, Lisa and Alexey Olenin's father
 Yekaterina Guseva as Maria Olenina, Lisa and Alexey Olenin's mother
 Alexander Michkov as Alexey Olenin
 Anton Nikishin as Alexey Olenin in childhood
 Daniil Strakhov as Mamonov
 Fyodor Lavrov as Semyon, a serf
 Farkhad Makhmudov as Mirza
 Vasili Michkov as General Leonty Dubelt, manager of the Third Department

Production 
Candidate of Historical Sciences and expert on the Caucasian war Patimat Takhnayeva, describing the historicity of the film, said that the script horrified her and that she considers the day of the premiere of the film "a day of national shame", and called the authors mankurts.

Principal photography started shooting in 2018 in Saint Petersburg and Dagestan.

Release 
The premiere date in the Russian Federation has been set for May 26, 2022 by KaroRental.

References

External links 
 

2022 films
2020s Russian-language films
2020s historical drama films
2022 war drama films
2022 biographical drama films
Russian historical drama films
Russian war drama films
Biographical films about military personnel
Russian biographical drama films
Films about the Russian Empire
War romance films
Films set in Saint Petersburg
Films set in the Russian Empire
Films shot in Saint Petersburg
Films shot in the North Caucasus